Keith Edward Yandell (Davenport, Iowa – , Madison, Wisconsin) was a philosopher of religion who became notable by his teaching and his writings.

Teaching
Yandell began teaching in the Department of Philosophy at the University of Wisconsin, Madison in 1966. He had become the Julius R. Weinberg Professor of Philosophy when he retired in 2011.

Beginning in 2004 and continuing after his retirement from the University of Wisconsin, Madison, Yandell became an Affiliate Professor of Philosophy at the 
Trinity Evangelical Divinity School in Deerfield, Illinois.

Education
Yandell earned a BA and an MA from Wayne State University. He received a PhD from Ohio State University.
His fields of expertise include: History of modern philosophy, Metaphysics, Philosophy of religion, Ethics, and Indian philosophy.

Works
Yandell has over 60 articles and reviews in journals listed in EBSCO. His books including those co-authored or edited follow:
Free Will and Evil (MA Thesis, Wayne State, 1960)
Metaphysical Systems and Decision Procedures (PhD Dissertation, Ohio State, 1966)
Basic Issues in the Philosophy of Religion (Allyn and Bacon, 1971)
Problems in Philosophical Inquiry: Theory of Knowledge (Holt, Rinehart and Winston, 1971)
Metaphysics (Holt, Rinehart and Winston, 1971)
Theory of Knowledge (Holt, Rinehart and Winston, 1971)
Philosophy of Religion (Holt, Rinehart and Winston, 1971)
Ethics (Holt, Rinehart and Winston, 1971)
God, Man, and Religion (McGraw-Hill, 1973)
Christianity and Philosophy (Eerdmans, 1984)
Hume's Inexplicable Mystery: His Views on Religion (Temple University, 1990)
The Epistemology of Religious Experience (Cambridge University Press, 1994)
Philosophy of Religion: A Contemporary Introduction (Routledge, 1999)
Religion and Public Culture: Encounters and Identities in Modern South India (Routledge, 2000)
Faith and Narrative (Oxford University Press, 2001)
Buddhism: A Christian Exploration and Appraisal (InterVarsity Press/Paternoster, 2009)
Spirituality Without God?: Buddhist Enlightenment and Christian Salvation (Paternoster, 2009)
The Soul (Defence of the Evidential Value of) (Ashgate, 2015)
In addition to books, Yandell has published essays on Anselm, miracles, and religious language; as well as a series of articles on the problem of evil; a series of articles on the epistemic status of religious experience; a series of articles on Hume's philosophy of religion; a series of articles on the supposed ineffability of religious beings or experiences; a series of articles on Indian philosophy; a series of articles on religion and morality; and a series of articles on philosophical issues concerning Christian theology, especially concerning the nature of God. He was working on metaphysical issues in the philosophy of religion and on religious pluralism.

References

1938 births
2020 deaths
American evangelicals
American philosophy academics
Protestant philosophers
Philosophers of religion
University of Wisconsin–Madison faculty
Ohio State University alumni